Nông Sơn is a new rural district of Quảng Nam province in the South Central Coast region of Vietnam. It was established in 2008 when part of Quế Sơn district split to form Nông Sơn District. The district capital is under construction.

Communes
Nông Sơn district is subdivided into 7 communes: Quế Lộc, Quế Trung, Quế Ninh, Quế Phước, Quế Lâm, Sơn Viên and Phước Ninh.

References

Districts of Quảng Nam province